Grifo, Duke of Maine (726–753) was the son of the Frankish major domo Charles Martel and his second wife Swanachild.

After the death of Charles Martel, power may well have been intended to be divided among Grifo and his half-brothers Pepin the Younger (Pepin the Short) and Carloman. Grifo, who was considered illegitimate by Pepin and Carloman, was besieged in Laon by his half-brothers, captured, and imprisoned in a monastery.

On his escape in 747, his maternal great-uncle Duke Odilo of Bavaria provided support and assistance to Grifo, but when Odilo died a year later and Grifo attempted to seize the duchy of Bavaria for himself, Pepin, who had become sole major domo of the Frankish (Merovingian) Empire upon Carloman's resignation and retreat into a monastery, took decisive action by invading Bavaria and installing Odilo's infant son, Tassilo III, as duke under Frankish overlordship. Grifo continued his rebellion, but was eventually killed in the battle of Saint-Jean de Maurienne in 753, while Pepin became king of the Franks as Pepin III in 751.

Reference/Source 
"Grifo", in Charles Cawley's 'Medieval Lands Project', hosted at the Foundation for Medieval Genealogy

726 births
753 deaths
8th-century dukes of Bavaria
Frankish warriors
Pippinids